Anne-Sophie Calvez (born 25 May 1983, in Nantes) is a French former competitive figure skater. She is the 2007 French national champion and 2003–2005 national silver medalist. She reached the free skate at four ISU Championships – 2003 Europeans in Malmö, Sweden, where she achieved her highest placement, 11th; 2003 Worlds in Washington, D.C., United States; 2004 Worlds in Dortmund, Germany; and 2007 Europeans in Warsaw, Poland.

Programs

Competitive highlights
GP: Grand Prix; JGP: Junior Grand Prix

References

External links 

 

French female single skaters
1983 births
Living people
Sportspeople from Nantes